This is a list of Bosniak novelists, poets and other writers.

A

Abdulah Sidran (born 1944), writer and poet
Abdulvehab Ilhamija (1773–1821), poet and prose writer
Ahmed Muradbegović (1898–1972), writer, dramatist and novelist
Alija Isaković (1932–1997), writer, essayist, publicist, playwright, and lexicographer
Asaf Duraković (born 1940), poet
Avdo Humo (1914–1983), writer and politician
Ayşe Kulin (born 1941), Turkish novelist and columnist with Bosniak ancestry

B
Bisera Alikadić (born 1939), poet

D
Derviš Sušić (1924–1990), writer
Dževad Karahasan (born 1953), writer and philosopher

E

Edhem Mulabdić (1862–1954), writer
Emir Suljagić (born 1975), author
Enver Čolaković (1913–1976), novelist, poet and translator

F
Faruk Šehić (born 1970), poet, novelist and short story writer
Feđa Isović (born 1965), screenplay writer

H

Hasan Kafi Pruščak (1544–1615), scholar
Hasan Kikić (1905–1942), literate and poet
Hamdija Kreševljaković (1888–1959), historian
Hamid Ekrem Šahinović (1882–1936), writer and dramatist
Hamid Dizdar (1907–1967), writer and poet
Hamza Humo (1895–1970), poet, dramatist, and writer of short novels

I
Ivan Franjo Jukić (1818–1857), Catholic writer who considered himself Bosniak
Izet Sarajlić (1930–2002), historian, essayist, translator and poet

J
Jasmin Imamović (born 1956), writer and the current mayor of Tuzla

K
Karim Zaimović (1971–1995), writer, journalist and publicist

M

Mak Dizdar (1917–1971), poet
Mehmed Kapetanović (1839–1902), writer
Midhat Ajanović (born 1959), writer
Muhamed Bekir Kalajdžić (1892–1963), writer, bookseller and publisher
Muhamed Filipović (1929–2020), academic, philosopher, writer, theorist, essayist and historian
Muhamed Hevaji Uskufi Bosnevi (1601–1651), poet and writer
Mula Mustafa Bašeskija (1731–1809), chronicler, diarist, poet and calligrapher
Musa Ćazim Ćatić (1878–1915), poet and writer
Mustafa Busuladžić (1914–1945), writer and scientist
Mustafa Ejubović (1651–1707), historian, writer, and Mufti of Mostar

N

Nafija Sarajlić (1893–1970), first female Bosniak prose writer
Nasiha Kapidžić-Hadžić (1932–1995), children's author and poet
Nedžad Ibrišimović (1940–2011), writer
Nihad Hasanović (born 1974), writer and translator
Nijaz Duraković (1949–2012), author and intellectual

O

Osman Nuri Hadžić (1869–1937), intellectual and writer

S

Safet Plakalo (1950–2015), playwright and poet
Safvet beg Bašagić (1870–1934), writer and poet
Semezdin Mehmedinović (born 1960), writer
Semir Osmanagić (born 1960), writer
Senad Hadžimusić (born 1957), poet and songwriter
Šemso Tucaković (born 1946), writer and historian
Šerbo Rastoder (born 1956), historian
Skender Kulenović (1910–1978), poet, novelist and dramatist

T
Tarik Samarah (born 1965), author
Téa Obreht (born 1985), naturalized American novelist with Bosniak ancestry, author of The Tiger's Wife (2011)

U
Umihana Čuvidina (1794–1870), Ottoman poet

V
Vehid Gunić (1941–2017), writer and journalist

Z
Zaim Topčić (1920–1990), writer
Zija Dizdarević (1916–1942), prose writer
Zlatko Topčić (born 1955), writer and screenwriter
Zuko Džumhur (1920–1989), writer

See also
List of Bosniaks
List of Bosniaks in music

Bosnian language
Writers
Writers
Bosnian